Jacques Lancelot (24 April 1920 – 7 February 2009) was a French classical clarinetist.

Biography
Born in Rouen, France, he studied at the conservatoire of Caen with Fernand Blachet, and at the Conservatoire de Paris with Auguste Périer and Fernand Oubradous, where he graduated in 1939. He is considered an exponent of the traditional French clarinet school with a clear and transparent sound.

For many years he was professor of clarinet at the conservatoire of Rouen, as well as at the Conservatoire National Supérieur de Musique de Lyon and at the "l'Académie Internationale de Nice". Frequently he served as juror in the Geneva International Music Competition and the Conservatoire de Paris. He was a solo performer at the famous Concerts Lamoureux and the Garde Républicaine, as well as a member of the "Quintette á vent Français", with:

 Jean-Pierre Rampal, flute
 Pierre Pierlot, oboe
 Gilbert Coursier, horn
 Paul Hongne, bassoon.

He gave the first performance of the famously difficult clarinet concerto by Jean Françaix of which, in 1976, in his book "Clarinet", Jack Brymer wrote:
 "A work for the future, possibly, when the instrument has developed further or the human hand has changed. At present, its roulades in the key of B major are beyond almost any player; but the work is a worthwhile challenge, and the A-clarinet would probably provide the answer." 

Additionally, he gave the premieres of works by Jean Rivier, Roger Calmel, Bernard Beugnot and others.

A clarinet competition bears its name : "Jacques Lancelot International Clarinet Competition". Lancelot also worked with Buffet to develop their Festival clarinet model.

He has a considerable discography on Erato and King Records.

Honours

He was named an honorary member of the International Clarinet Association.

Bibliography

References

 Paul, Jean-Marie : Jacques Lancelot - in : Clarinette magazine, N°14, 1988, pp 36f
 Paul, Jean-Marie : Jacques Lancelot: a tribute - The Clarinet, 2006, vol. 34/1, pp 43–50 (incl. biography, list of works, discography)
 Jacques Lancelot's obituary 

French classical clarinetists
1920 births
2009 deaths
Musicians from Rouen
20th-century classical musicians
20th-century French musicians
French music educators